Roderick Parry Clements (born 17 November 1947 in North Shields, Northumberland) is a British guitarist, singer-songwriter and multi-instrumentalist. He formed the folk-rock band Lindisfarne with Alan Hull in 1970, and wrote "Meet Me on the Corner", a UK Top 5 hit in March 1972, which won Clements an Ivor Novello Award. Lindisfarne broke up in 1973 and Clements became a founding member of Jack the Lad, also working with Ralph McTell and Bert Jansch.  Lindisfarne reformed in 1977 and Clements continued to be part of the line-up until 2003. Rod rejoined Lindisfarne in 2015 and is currently touring and performing with the band.

Career
Clements was an only child, and grew up in a household in which neither parent was especially active musically, though his mother did play the piano. His father was a lover of classical music and he encouraged his son to attend concerts. Clements attended The King's School, Tynemouth after which, at the age of 12, he was sent to Durham School. He subsequently attended Durham University (St. Cuthbert's Society), graduating with a BA in ancient history and anthropology.

From an early age he had been able to pick up a tune and play it and his first inspiration to play the guitar came from hearing the hits of Duane Eddy, The Shadows and The Ventures. By 1965 he had formed an R&B group called Downtown Faction.

As a bass guitarist, Clements teamed up with local musicians in North Shields to form a blues band (also called the Downtown Faction). The band was later renamed Brethren, and became regular performers at folk clubs in the North East. Clements befriended a Newcastle singer/songwriter called Alan Hull, and formed the folk-rock band Lindisfarne with him and several members of Brethren in 1970. Although Hull was Lindisfarne's main songwriter, Clements provided the band with its first hit in "Meet Me on the Corner", a UK Top 5 hit in March 1972. Clements won a Certificate of Honour at the Ivor Novello Awards for the song.

Lindisfarne broke up in 1973 and Clements became a founding member of Jack the Lad, which also included two other former Lindisfarne members, on whose debut album It's Jack The Lad he played a significant role as multi-instrumentalist and songwriter. In 1974 he played bass on Ralph McTell's "Streets of London", which topped the UK charts at Christmas that year. Clements went on to tour and record several albums with McTell. He also worked with Bert Jansch, touring Britain and Europe and working as Producer on Bert's comeback album A Rare Conundrum. Clements and Jansch also recorded a Woody Guthrie tribute album, Woody Lives!, and the jointly credited Leather Launderette.

Lindisfarne reformed in 1977 and Clements continued to be part of the line-up, contributing many songs to albums such as Back and Fourth, The News, Sleepless Nights and Dance Your Life Away. Following Alan Hull's death in 1995 Rod became the band's main songwriter who, in partnership with producer and co-writer Nigel Stonier, provided the bulk of material for Lindisfarne's two last albums, Here Comes The Neighbourhood (1998) and Promenade (2002). The band finally broke up following a concert in Newcastle Opera House in November 2003.

Clements' main role in Lindisfarne was that of bassist until 1990, when he moved to slide guitar and mandolin; his former role was filled thereafter by Steve Cunningham and latterly Ian Thomson.  Clements also played violin from time to time, most notably in the instrumental break of "Fog on the Tyne", both on stage and on disc.

Clements has also toured and recorded with Rab Noakes and Michael Chapman and performed on albums by Peter Hammill, Wizz Jones and Kathryn Tickell amongst others. He has also supplied bass, dobro, and guitar parts to albums by singer/songwriter Thea Gilmore, who has herself appeared on Rod's solo albums.

Clements released the album One Track Mind in 1994, and followed this with Stamping Ground in 2000, having written or co-written each of the tracks. Another album, Odd Man Out was released in 2006. It was produced by Nigel Stonier. Spring 2008 saw the reissue with bonus tracks of One Track Mind. He continues to tour regularly, performing a mixture of Lindisfarne songs and his solo efforts.

Songs written by Clements have been covered by artists including Melanie Safka and Joe Brown; and a Clements/Stonier composition, "Can't Do Right For Doing Wrong", was a British Top 30 hit for Erin Rocha at Christmas 2003.

Clements re-joined Lindisfarne in 2015, replacing co-founder Ray Jackson retired from the band, with the band he now performs vocals, slide guitar, mandolin, violin.

Discography 
Solo albums 
 One Track Mind (1994)
 Stamping Ground (2000)
 Live Ghosts (2004)
 Odd Man Out (2006)
 One Track Mind 2008 (2008) – with bonus tracks

Lindisfarne albums with Clements 
 Nicely Out of Tune (1970)
 Fog on the Tyne (1971)
 Dingly Dell (1972)
 Back And Fourth (1978)
 The News (1979)
 Sleepless Nights (1982)
 Dance Your Life Away (1986)
 Amigos (1989)
 Elvis Lives on the Moon (1993)
 Blues from the Bothy (EP) (1997)
 Here Comes the Neighbourhood (1998)
 Promenade (2002)

Jack the Lad 
 It's Jack the Lad (1973)
 
 with Bert Jansch 
 "In the Bleak Midwinter" (single) (1974)
 A Rare Conundrum (1976)

 Bert Jansch & Rod Clements 
 Leather Launderette (1988)

 with Ralph McTell 
 "Streets of London" (single) (1974)
 Streets (album) (1975)
 Right Side Up (1976)
 Songs from Alphabet Zoo (1983)

 with Prelude 
 Owl Creek Incident (1975)

 with Dando Shaft 
 Kingdom (1977)

 with Michael Chapman 
 The Man Who Hated Mornings (1977)
 Looking for Eleven (1980)
 Plaindealer (2005)

 with Jim Rafferty 
 Don't Talk Back (1978)

 with Rab Noakes
 Rab Noakes (1980)
 Under the Rain (1983)
 Throwing Shapes (Rab Noakes & The Varaflames) (2000)

 with Thea Gilmore 
 The Lipstick Conspiracies (2000)
 Songs from the Gutter (2002)

 with Nigel Stonier 
 Golden Coins (1993)
 Brimstone & Blue (2002)

 with Peter Hammill 
 Fool's Mate (1971)

 with Wizz Jones 
 Happiness Was Free (1976)

 with Kathryn Tickell 
 Borderlands (1986)

 with Pentangle
 So Early in the Spring (1989)

 with Mark Knopfler 
 Newport Mount Rag (recorded 1974)

Various artists 
 Woody Lives! (Woody Guthrie tribute album) (1987)
 People on the Highway (Bert Jansch tribute album) (2000)

References

External links
 
 Discography
 Odd Man Out

1947 births
Living people
English folk musicians
British folk rock musicians
English folk guitarists
English male guitarists
English blues musicians
English blues guitarists
Slide guitarists
English bass guitarists
Male bass guitarists
English multi-instrumentalists
Folk fiddlers
British mandolinists
English male singers
English songwriters
People from North Shields
Musicians from Tyne and Wear
People educated at The King's School, Tynemouth
Alumni of St Cuthbert's Society, Durham
Pentangle (band) members
Lindisfarne (band) members
21st-century violinists
21st-century British male musicians
British male songwriters